Khoto Sesinyi (born 6 March 1977) is a Mosotho footballer who currently plays as a defender for Lesotho Prison Service. He also plays for the Lesotho national football team, winning 17 caps since 2003.

References

External links

Association football defenders
Lesotho footballers
Lesotho international footballers
1977 births
Living people
Lesotho Correctional Services players